Barathrites is a genus of cusk-eels found in deep waters of the northwest Atlantic Ocean.

Species
There are currently two recognized species in this genus:
 Barathrites iris Zugmayer, 1911
 Barathrites parri Nybelin, 1957

References

Ophidiidae